Events from the year 1779 in Canada.

Incumbents

Governors

Events

Births

Deaths
 February 14 – James Cook killed by Hawaiian natives, cutting short his search for Northwest Passage. (born 1728)

Historical documents

American Revolutionary War
Congress concurs with committee that argues U.S. lacks financial, supply and strategic strength to undertake with France "the Emancipation of Canada"

"That is the place where the hart of Canada was broke before" - Gen. Washington is told Lake Ontario, Niagara and Detroit are vulnerable to U.S. attack

Washington summons Maj. Gen. Sullivan to go over plan for "an Expedition of an extensive nature agt the hostile tribes of the Indians of the six Nations"

Schuyler receives word that Joseph Brant "is gone with a very large Belt of Wampum to the seven Tribes in Canada" to recruit them for attack on Oswego

Intelligence says Onondaga "seem determined to make peace with the United States" and that Cayuga party is on its way to confer with Oneida

Intelligence from Canada claims "Canadians being much Oppress’d wish to be delivered from British Bondage; the Abenaques of St Francis wish likewise"

Wampum message from Canada to Penobscot and "St Johns" Indigenous people: reject Americans, "for Powder & Balls has No Respect to Persons"

Washington believes Six Nations will seek peace only as long as they feel fear, and intends "to punish them severely [and] intimidate them in future"

Onondaga non-combatants coming to Oneida while warriors attack British to prove loyalty, hoping "to repossess their Country after the Close of the War"

Joseph Brant warns people of Sussex County, New Jersey that all who do not join him will be considered enemies, and he will "lay the Country waste"

Orders to Sullivan for "total destruction and devastation" of British-allied Six Nations' settlements and crops, even to "prevent their planting more"

"Colonel Louis the Indian" back from Kahnawake with word that Brant failed to recruit there and that 1,000 Odawa and Ojibwe would attack U.S. frontier

In undated speech, Gov. Haldimand upbraids and threatens war on Oneida for turning against Britain and its Indigenous allies in Six Nations

Sullivan describes beautifully situated Chemung village's chapel, houses and fields of crops before all are cheerfully "destroyed root and branch"

After long account of battle in Seneca country, Sullivan describes "Fields of the best Corn and Beans so extensive" as took army all day to destroy

Sullivan's thorough scorched earth campaign extends to Chenussio, "the grand Capital of the Indian Country," then turns toward Cayuga territory

"Total ruin of the Indian territories" - Sullivan reports destruction of Indigenous people's crops, orchards and towns near lakes Seneca and Cayuga

Pro-British Indigenous forces superior (20 scalps to 1) to "rebel Indians" in New York, and John Johnson bringing 1,000 troops and all "Canada Indians"

"Sullivan and his swarm of locusts" are "demolishing the Indian crops and wigwams," but John Butler and Brant may retaliate along Mohawk River

Molly Brant says Indigenous allies from Canada feel Guy Johnson takes "more Notice of those that are Suspected than them that are known to be Loyal"

Col. Moses Hazen says Canadians "utterly Refused" active service and clergy "Avoiding as much as Possible entering into the grand Political Dispute"

Canada
Crown agrees that Peter Livius was improperly dismissed as Quebec chief justice after he complained that Guy Carleton created illegal "Privy Council"

Montreal snowfall comes after six months without rain, when flour mills at Terrebonne and Sault-au-Récollet lacked enough water to turn wheels

"Artful management of rapacious and designing Men" keeps price of wheat and flour high and forces extension of ban on exporting them and biscuit

Royal Navy commanding officer on St. Lawrence River tells shipwrights and caulkers hiding from impressment they will be free to go after employment

Rewards of $10 each for "Negro Lad" and "Wench," she very fluent in English and French and has her apparel (black satin cloak, caps, bonnets, etc.)

Missing from ship Susannah "a black Boy" named John Thompson, born in Spanish Town, Jamaica; whoever returns him will receive 1 guinea reward

Reward ($10) for "Negro Slave named Ishmaël," about 35, hair black, long and curly, and "tone of voice peculiar to New-England, where he was born"

Former surgeon's mate in Quebec City general hospital informs ship captains that he will treat sick and hurt sailors "with the greatest tenderness"

"An Institution so peculiarly useful in this Country" - Subscription begun for Quebec City public library, favoured by both governor and bishop

List of 68 publicans and retailers with liquor licences in Quebec City, of whom 11 have shops and 6 have women's names

Nova Scotia
"Unpublished" Nova Scotia act allows government to borrow up to £5,000 for armed ships to protect coast

"Unpublished" Nova Scotia act supports "more effectual" confiscation of land and other property of persons who have left to join rebellion

Recommending construction of road from Penobscot River to St. John River, Congressional committee summarizes Nova Scotians' efforts to join U.S.A.

Intelligence reports say Acadians "Warmly Attached to the American cause;" so are "Indians[...]but are[...]Receiving very Great Supplys from the Enemy"

In Council and House of Assembly, Lt. Gov. Hughes reports reestablishing peace with Indigenous peoples, who have ended 1776 alliance with rebels

Recent riot on Halifax wharf prompts repeat of proclamation forbidding impressment or searching for deserters without civil authority permission

While entering Halifax harbour on stormy night, sloop-of-war and armed ship collide and sink, with about 170 lost, including all but 3 on warship

"State of People's mind's in this place is disagreable enough" - Thousands of rumours, many of them false, breed constant uncertainty and suspense

JPs are to fully enforce ban on gaming ("Cards, Dice, &c.") because "the Fortunes of many have been ruined, and the Lives of many Persons lost"

Printer raises price of Nova Scotia Gazette because of "the extraordinary high Price of every necessary of Life as well of Stock and Materials"

Fighting words in reply to Boston-published report of "gasconading" Nova Scotian saying Haligonians openly favour "American Cause"

Advertisement for people who can supply 15,000 lb. of fresh beef to Navy ships and yard in Halifax

Plaintiff "Elizabeth Watson alias Phillis a Negro Woman" loses case to William Proud, who may "Recover and hold [her] as the property and Slave of him"

"Yeoman" sells to tanner for £50 "Negro Boy Named Abram now about twelve Years of age who was Born of my Negro slave in my House in Maryland"

For sale: "Negro Wench, about 21 Years of Age who is capable of performing both Town and Country house Work, she is an exceeding good Cook[....]"

"An Epitaph lately taken from a Grave Stone at Annapolis" (Note: racial stereotypes)

Frederick Goget warns all against hiding his wife, Mary, who has "eloped from my Bed and board[...]because, she says, that I am poor, which is false"

Real estate of late Jonathan Belcher for sale, including 1,000-acre farm at Windsor with some "of the best Dyke Land in the Country" and Halifax dwelling

"Many, particularly the French Acadians" are accused of cutting and taking timber and grass on east shore of Halifax harbour and warned of prosecution

To reduce accidents from "negligent and disorderly" riding or cart or sleigh driving, ordinance calls for fine, labour on highways, or "stripes"

"Wanted. A Woman with a good Breast of Milk, to live in a Family."

Prince Edward Island
St. John's Island family has little success in cattle, as high prices keep demand low, they have few cows fit for market, and bear has killed two

To improve horse breeding, no stallions over 1-year-old will be allowed to roam; also, no "partridges" to be killed in breeding season

Newfoundland
With decline of Newfoundland fishery, objection arises to Palliser-inspired law requiring ships be British-built, offering paltry bounties to fishers, etc.

"Without windows, without chimnies, the light of heaven coming in the same hole which lets out the smoke" - Marston finds Quidi Vidi's houses miserable

Officer at St. John's happy to buy armed brig on which his recruits can escape "an Island destitute of every necessary support whatever for our Men"

Newfoundland Volunteers enlists 200 men who agree to "learn the use of Arms with the utmost Assiduity, [when] care of ourselves & families will allow"

Navy frigate on Newfoundland convoy takes French privateer and distributes its sailors across convoy in swap for merchant hands to man prize

Labrador
In Labrador, George Cartwright avoids mutiny over food with threats and convincing staff to eat fox, which saves salt pork and thus averts starvation

"Painful necessity of inflicting corporal punishment" - Cartwright lashes worker until he faints, after man had threatened him with hatchet

Cartwright says Mrs. Selby was unfaithful to him with trapper (whose offer to swear oath he refuses (later he confesses)); also disowns her new baby

Having tamed caribou calf after killing its mother, Cartwright details his impressions of species based on much observation of them

Cartwright has knowledge of polar bears, including their going far inland where they catch only porcupines and small fish, and elsewhere eat seaweed

Cartwright finds wolverine has gone six miles with his 8-lb. trap on one foot by carrying it in its mouth and running on three legs

Elsewhere
Traders west of Lake Superior establish North-West Company "for their common safety in a country where they had no protection from their Government"

Hudson's Bay Company sloop at Churchill prepared for voyage with caulking, tarring, painting, overhauling etc. in unusually cold June and July

References 

 
Canada
79